Khaan Khuns - Erchim FC is a professional football club from Ulaanbaatar, Mongolia who have been playing in the Mongolian Premier League, which they have won ten times, since its inaugural year in 1996. The Mongolian Football Federation applied to enter the 2012 AFC President's Cup, and was approved by the AFC in November 2011. As winners of the 2012 Super Cup, Erchim were awarded the place in the competition. In 2017 the club qualified for the AFC Cup, becoming the first Mongolian club to do so.

While most of other Ulaanbaatar clubs share the MFF Football Centre, Erchim was the first one to have its own stadium. In 2020 the club merged with Khaan Khuns Titem, to establish Khaan Khuns - Erchim FC.

History

Domestic

Continental

Players

Current squad

Honours
 Mongolia Premier League: (13)
 Winner: 1996, 1998, 2000, 2002, 2007, 2008, 2012, 2013, 2015, 2016, 2017, 2018, 2022
 Runner-up: 1997, 1999, 2009, 2014, 2019
 Mongolia Cup: (9)
 Winner: 1996, 1997, 1998, 1999, 2000, 2011, 2012, 2015, 2019
 Runner-up: 2001, 2002, 2014
 Mongolia Super Cup: (9)
 Winner: 2011, 2012, 2013, 2014, 2016, 2017, 2019, 2020, 2022

References

External links
 Mongolian Football Federation

Football clubs in Mongolia
1994 establishments in Mongolia
Association football clubs established in 1994
Works association football teams